Warwick  Musical Theatre was a musical theater located on Route 2 in Warwick, Rhode Island.

Buster Bonoff opened the theatre in 1955 on the site of an open field. Initially the theatre hosted touring Broadway shows, but by the 1970s "big-name" entertainers became its standard offering.

In 1967, the original tent was replaced with a 3,300-seat theatre in the round that used a building from the 1964 New York World's Fair. It also hosted yearly summer shows by World Wrestling Entertainment until 1999.

Demise 
Facing increased competition from larger venues and the two casinos in Connecticut, Foxwoods and Mohegan Sun, Warwick Musical Theatre hosted a farewell season in 1999, ending its 54th season with a concert by Vince Gill.

The founders of the theatre, Buster and Barbara Bonoff, did not live long after the theatre closed. Buster died in 2000 and Barbara in 2003.

The Warwick Musical Theatre was torn down in June 2002, and a Lowe's now occupies the site.

Since its demise, the theatre has been honored by a pair of Rhode Island artists. Frank Galasso included it in two of his lithographs, Remember When... and Icons of Rhode Island Past and present. Duke Marcoccio made a commemorative ornament as a part of his series of 'My  Little Town' Rhode Island landmarks.

In 2009, The Tent: Life in the Round was shown in local theaters and is now available on DVD from Revolving Stage Productions.

References

External links 
 Bonoff Foundation for the Warwick Musical Theater
 Frank Galasso Official Web Site
 Duke Marcoccio Official Web Site

1955 establishments in Rhode Island
1999 disestablishments in Rhode Island
Buildings and structures in Warwick, Rhode Island
Demolished buildings and structures in Rhode Island
Buildings and structures demolished in 2002